The International Copyright Act of 1891 (March 3, 1891) is the first U.S. congressional act that extended limited protection to foreign copyright holders from select nations.
Formally known as the "International Copyright Act of 1891", but more commonly referred to as the "Chace Act" after Sen. Jonathan Chace of Rhode Island.

The International Copyright Act of 1891 was created because many people shunned the idea of literary piracy. It was the first U.S. congressional act that offered copyright protection in the United States to citizens of countries other than the United States. The act extended limited protection to foreign copyright holders from select nations. It was also important for American creators since they were more likely to have international copyright protection in countries that were offered the same protection by the United States. The Act empowered the President to extend copyright to works of foreign nationals.

The act was passed on March 3, 1891, by the 51st Congress. The Act went into effect on July 1, 1891.  On July 3, 1891, the first foreign work, a play called Saints and Sinners by British author Henry Arthur Jones, was registered under the act.

Background

The protection of foreign works 

During the time when the United States was just beginning to develop its own literary tradition, the nation refused to protect foreign works. As a result, American works were unprotected abroad and domestic publishers had to compete with each other for cheap editions of foreign works. Prior to the International Copyright Act, the first national copyright law was passed in 1790 and provided a copyright protection for 14 years, but only for authors who were citizens or residents of the United States. In order to get copyright protection in the rest of the world, American authors were required to gain residency in the country in which they desired copyright protection. For example, Mark Twain obtained residency in Canada to protect his publication of The Prince and the Pauper.

To protect foreign literature in the United States, British authors would have an American citizen serve as a collaborator in the publishing process, and then have the book registered in Washington, D.C. under the collaborator's name. It was not until the 1830s that the pressure to extend American copyright to foreign authors first developed. Both American and British authors and publishers joined forces and pushed for a bilateral treaty between the United States and England. Famous authors such as Charles Dickens came to the United States to show their support for international copyright. Their biggest problem were American printers that already were protected by a high tariff on imported works, and who had no wish to pay royalties to English writers or publishers.

The United States discussed international copyright with Great Britain over the years. Congress requested correspondence to this effect in 1842. There was a proposed treaty in 1853 under Millard Fillmore, and consideration of its ratification continued into an extension provided during Franklin Pierce's presidency in 1854.

Nonetheless, in the United States, only works published in the United States could be restricted with copyright. Authors including Mark Twain, Louisa May Alcott, Edward Eggleston, and Bill Nye wrote letters in the mid-1880s to the Century requesting international copyright. These letters to the journals had a strong effect on this issue, as did the American Copyright League that was formed in 1883. The League was a great supporter of an International Copyright Act and, at the Madison Square Theater in 1885, the League sponsored readings by American authors in aid of the League's cause.

In 1885, United States Senator Joseph Roswell Hawley introduced a bill aimed at extending copyright to foreign authors for consideration by Congress. A chief difference between the Hawley Bill and the eventual Chace Bill was Hawley's removal of publisher and book-sellers' interests in the copyright process. It was ultimately unsuccessful, though Mark Twain involved himself in the lobbying process and influenced President Grover Cleveland's thinking on the matter. Cleveland asked Congress for legislation to this effect in his State of the Union address that December.

"National treatment" 

While the United States was refusing any protection for foreign literary works, more and more countries in Europe started adapting the principle of "national treatment". This principle meant that each nation that signed the treaty was obligated to protect works produced by nationals of all other treaty members on the same terms that it protects its own nationals.

In 1884, academics, writers and diplomats met in Berne, Switzerland, to begin the work to form a multilateral copyright treaty. This was based on the principle of national treatment together with minimum standards so that a member country would be free to treat the copyrighted work of its own nationals however they chose to, but when it came to the works from other treaty members it would have to obey certain minimum standards. The treaty was signed in 1886 but the United States was not one of its founding members. American representatives had attended the Berne conference only as observers and it would take another 5 years until the United States took its first step to protect foreign works.

Effects of the Act

"The manufacturing clause" 

Ever since the first national copyright law in 1790, the United States had required certain "statutory formalities" to acquire copyright protection. These formalities served as a test of an author's intention to claim protection for his or her work. The International Copyright Act of 1891 now applied these formalities to foreign publishers as well, but added an extra requirement called the "Manufacturing Clause".

The Manufacturing Clause required that all copies of foreign literary works should be printed from type set in the United States if they were to have American protection. This was an obvious concession to American printers, since they might otherwise have opposed the Act. When the International Copyright Act of 1891 was finally passed, foreign authors had to have their works in Washington, D.C. "on or before the day of publication in this or any foreign country." This too would create a problem, but by the early 1900s British authors were granted American Copyright since it was published abroad thirty days from its deposit in Washington, D.C. This would then allow American publishers time to release an authorized edition.

Provisions of the Act 

The International Copyright Act of 1891 instituted important changes in copyright matters. One of the most extensive changes was that from the date the Act went into effect, all books were required to be manufactured in the United States in order to obtain American copyright. However, foreign authors had a better chance of protecting their works than before. This Act was the first step that the United States took towards an international copyright that could benefit foreign authors as well as domestic. Throughout time, the United States had been somewhat of a copyright outcast since they had not joined many international treaties or conventions. However, as the United States became a major exporter of copyrighted materials this changed. Even if there's still no such thing as an "international copyright" that will automatically protect an author's rights throughout the world, The International Copyright Act of 1891 was the first step to a number of international copyright treaties and conventions that the United States is now a part of (e.g. Berne Convention, Universal Copyright Convention, WIPO).

Presidents grant international copyrights

The following is a timeline of presidents granting copyright to other countries:
 July 1, 1891: Belgium, France, Switzerland, Great Britain and its colonies by Benjamin Harrison
 April 15, 1892: German Empire by Benjamin Harrison
 October 31, 1892: Italy by Benjamin Harrison
 May 8, 1893: Denmark by Grover Cleveland
 July 20, 1893: Portugal by Grover Cleveland
 July 10, 1895: Spain by Grover Cleveland
 February 27, 1896: Mexico by Grover Cleveland
 May 25, 1896: Chile by Grover Cleveland
 October 19, 1899: Costa Rica by William McKinley
 November 20, 1899: The Netherlands by William McKinley
 November 17, 1903: Cuba by Theodore Roosevelt
 July 1, 1905: Norway by Theodore Roosevelt

The Copyright Act of 1909 had its own prescriptions for extending copyright to other countries.

See also
 Bilateral copyright agreements of the United States

Further reading
 Allingham, Philip V. The Victorian Web. "Nineteenth-Century British and American Copyright Law."
 Bowden, Edwin T. American Literature. "Henry James and the Struggle for International Copyright: An Unnoticed Item in the James Bibliography." v. 24, no. 4: 1953 p. 537(3). 
 Goldstein, Paul. American Literature. "Copyright's Highway: From Gutenberg to the Celestial Jukebox.", revised edition, 2003, Stanford University Press, p. 150-151.

References

External links
 Allingham, Philip V.: Nineteenth-Century British and American Copyright Law
 Arts & Humanities Research Council: International Copyright Act (The Chace Act), Washington D.C. (1891)
 Laws.com: International Copyright Act of 1891 Overview
 Post, David G.: Some Thoughts on the Political Economy of Intellectual Property: A Brief Look at the International Copyright Relations of the United States
 US Copyright Office: International Copyright
 US Copyright Office: International Copyright Relations of the United States
 US Copyright Office: Notable Dates in American Copyright 1783-1969
 West, James L. W.: The Chace Act and Anglo-American Literary Relations
 WIPO: Berne Convention for the Protection of Literary and Artistic Works 
Archival footage of a discussion about The Copyright Act and Fair Use Doctrine in regards to dance material at Jacob's Pillow Dance Festival.

United States federal copyright legislation
Copyright legislation
1891 in law
1891 in American law
March 1891 events